Kubota engines are diesel and spark ignition engines manufactured by Kubota Corporation. Besides gasoline-fueled for spark ignition engines, the company produces dual fuel, LPG-fueled, and natural-gas-fueled engines as well. The engines are widely used in various forms, such as: agricultural equipments, construction equipments, gensets, tractors, and marine propulsion. Beta Marine, an international company providing marine propulsion engines, uses various Kubota engines for fresh water and sea-going boats of various sizes.

Engine Codes

Kubota has produced a wide variety of engines, from single cylinder to inline six engines; gasoline, dual fuel, LPG, and diesel; from the tiny 0.276 liter Kubota OC60-E to the large 6.1 liter V6108-CR-TI. The company follows a simple naming system for their engines:

1. The first characters mainly specify the engine cylinder configuration; however, in some engines, they also specify fuel type, and cooling system:

Note: Exception is for V3 Series. For the engines in these series, the first character denotes the cylinder configuration (4-cylinder inline), the first two digits denote engine series (V3), and then the four numbers following the first character (3xxx) denote engine displacement.

2. The next two numbers specify the engine displacement

3. The next one or two numbers - and "-M" for some engines - specify the engine series:

4. The suffix (separated by a dash or dashes) specifies the features of the engine:

Note: Sometimes some additional suffixes are added. These suffixes usually denote OEM Name (if the Kubota engines are used by other manufacturers) and Version Number. The numbering and/or character choices used in these suffixes depend on each manufacturer's naming or coding systems.

Some example engine codes:

Z482-E3B
Z = two cylinder inline, liquid-cooled diesel
48 = 480 cc (rounded)
2 = Super Mini Series
No "DI" = indirect injection
No "T" = normally-aspirated
E3B = Tier 4 industrial diesel because Kubota Z482-E3B generates less than 19 kW of power.

V2607-DI-T-E3B
V = four cylinder inline, liquid-cooled diesel
26 = 2,600 cc (rounded)
07 = 07 Series
DI = direct injection
T = turbocharged
E3B = Tier 4 Interim because V2607-DI-T-E3B generates less than 56 kW of power.

V2403-CR-TIE4B
V = four cylinder inline, liquid-cooled diesel
24 = 2,400 cc (rounded)
03 = 03 Series
CR = common-rail direct injection
T = turbocharged
I = intercooled
E4B = Tier 4 because V2403-CR-TIE4B generates less than 56 kW of power.

V3300-T
V (first character) = four cylinder inline, liquid-cooled diesel
V3 (first two digits) = engine series
3300 (four numbers after first character) = engine displacement 3,300 cc (rounded)
No "DI" = indirect injection
T = turbocharged

V1505-T-E2B-KSR/VMR/ACP
V = four cylinder inline, liquid-cooled diesel
15 = 1,500 cc (rounded)
05 = Super 05 Series
T = turbocharged
E2B = Tier 2 industrial diesel
KSR = code for Kaeser equipments
VMR = code for Vermeer equipments
ACP = code for Atlas Copco equipments

Gasoline / LPG / Natural Gas

WG/DF/DG Series

Unlike most manufacturers that build their gasoline engines and diesel engines based on different platforms, Kubota builds its gasoline/LPG/NG (natural gas) engines based on its diesel engines. The WG/DF/DG engines are solidly based on Kubota's Super Mini Series, Super 05 Series, 03 Series, and V3 Series diesel engines. This makes most of parts are interchangeable between Kubota's gasoline/LPG/NG engines and diesel engines in the equal engine series. These engines are 3- and 4-cylinder liquid-cooled engines.

Diesel 

Kubota makes both indirect and direct injection diesel. For the indirect injection system, Kubota's proprietary TVCS (Three Vortex Combustion System) obtains an optimum air/fuel mixture by generating three intense swirling air flows (vortexes) within the spherical-combustion (swirl) chamber. The new TVCS added a special concave recess on the piston head to force compression air in the swirl chamber and to smooth combustion gas exhaust. The E-TVCS, based on the new TVCS, is aimed at a drastic emission reduction. E-TVCS produces far less soot, HC and CO thanks to a better match between the injection nozzle throat and the concave recess on the piston head. The injection pump and nozzle are better matched with the combustion chamber to reduce NOx emissions.

As for the direct injection system, Kubota has developed several systems; from the conventional direct injection system (DIS) used in the two-valve per cylinder engine range, E-CDIS (Center Direct Injection System) used in the 3 to 4-valve per cylinder engine range, to the Common-Rail Direct Injection System in the latest generation of Kubota diesels to comply the latest emission regulations. The common-rail direct injection engines may be equipped with Diesel Oxidation Catalyst (DOC) or DOC and Diesel Particulate Filter (DPF).

EA Series

The Kubota EA Series is a single-cylinder, horizontal, liquid-cooled diesel engine. Kubota EA Series engines are mainly used for hand tractors and other agricultural equipment.

OC Series

The Kubota OC Series is a single-cylinder, vertical, air/oil-cooled diesel engine. Unlike other Kubota engines, Kubota OC Series engines rely on oil and air to cool the engines. There is a cooling fan connected to the crankshaft, also fan shroud and ducting to optimize the cooling system further. The Kubota OC Series engines are usually used for small/portable gensets and other light power applications. Some motorcycle enthusiasts use Kubota OC Series engines to power self-built or self-modified small diesel motorcycles due to the light weight and its simple air/oil cooling system.

RD Series

The Kubota RD Series is a single-cylinder, horizontal, liquid-cooled diesel engine. Its liquid cooling system does not use a radiator; instead, it uses a hopper style cooling system, in which, a coolant reservoir is placed directly on the engine. Kubota RD Series engines are in both indirect (TVCS) and direct injection forms.

Kubota RD Series engines are mainly used to power hand tractors, rice mills, and gensets. However, due to their versatility, many Kubota RD Series engines are also used for sawmill, propelling small boats/sampans, and even self-built light "trucks" in rural areas in some Asian countries.

ET Series

The Kubota ET Series is a horizontal, 4-Stroke diesel, 2 valves, indirect injection (TVCS), single-cylinder, liquid-cooled diesel engine. Produced 1980–2002.

RT Series

The Kubota RT Series is a single-cylinder, horizontal, liquid-cooled diesel engine. Its uses a hopper cooling system. Kubota RT Series used indirect injection (TVCS) and direct injection system. Kubota RT Series is second generation from Kubota ET Series. Production: RT, 2002–2008; RT plus, 2008–present; RT Plus Thunder, 2015–Present.
ES is Electric-starter
Plus version is a low-emission and low-consumption version
Thunder is new version throttle, Kubota call KGS-i (KUBOTA Governor System Intelligence)

ZT Series

The Kubota ZT Series is a single-cylinder, horizontal, liquid-cooled diesel engine. Its uses a hopper cooling system. Kubota RT Series used direct injection system. Kubota ZT Series is third generation from Kubota ET Series.

Super Mini Series

Kubota developed the world's smallest, multi-cylinder high power density diesel engine series, the Super Mini, in 1983. Starting out with just two models, this series remained a long time favorite for twenty years. In 2003, two new models joined this ever-popular 2- and 3-cylinder series. All Kubota Super Mini Series engines are in indirect injection system (E-TVCS).

The Kubota Super Mini Series engines are mainly used for gensets, small agricultural tractors, lawn mowers, and other light power applications. However, some motorcycle enthusiasts also use them to power self-built or self-modified diesel motorcycles. Aixam, a French automobile manufacturers, uses Kubota Z482 to power some of its micro cars.

The D722-T engine is available only for military use; however, limited numbers of D722-T are available at military surplus.

Super 05 Series

Kubota Super 05 Series engines are mainly for light to medium-light power applications. Small Kubota tractors, medium-sized lawnmowers, small excavators, medium-light gensets, and special vehicles or utility vehicles are usually equipped with Super 05 Series engines. Some kit car builders also use Kubota Super 05 Series engines to build fuel-efficient kit cars that can reach  on average. Other builders use Kubota Super 05 Series to repower light 4×4 vehicles. In addition, the SHERP amphibious all-terrain vehicle or Sherp ATV is powered by a  turbocharged Kubota V1505-T-E3B. All Kubota Super 05 Series engines are in indirect injection (E-TVCS) system. Available in 3- and 4-cylinder inline configurations.

The V1505-CR-T is the Common-rail Turbocharged version of the V1505. Introduced on April 23–28, 2018 at 2018 Intermat in Paris, it features a common-rail electronic fuel injection system, Diesel Oxidation Catalyst (DOC), and Diesel Particulate Filter (DPF). The main target of this new engine are special purpose non-road vehicles/machines such as small earth-moving and municipal machines. Although the main purpose of using common-rail electronic fuel injection, DOC, and DPF is to meet the latest emission standard (Stage V Regulation), there are slight increases in both power and torque as well. Kubota V1505-CR-T is planned to be fully mass-produced in 2020.

02 Series

Kubota 02 Series engines are small to medium-sized engines built by Kubota. All Kubota 02 Series engines have 82 mm stroke. Available in 3-, 4-, 5-, and 6-cylinder inline configurations, in both indirect and direct injection systems. This series is now discontinued.

03 Series and 03-M Series

Kubota 03 Series and 03-M Series engines are mainly used for medium power applications. Medium-sized tractors, construction equipment, gensets, and refrigerated containers are some of them. Some automotive enthusiasts use Kubota 03 Series and 03-M Series engines to power old four-wheelers such as Jeep Willys and CJ2s or 1990's light trucks and SUVs. Kubota V2003-T, V2203-DI modified with turbo-intercooler, and V2403-M-T are the popular choices.

The Kubota 03 Series and 03-M Series are available in indirect injection system (E-TVCS), direct injection system (DIS), and Common-Rail Direct Injection System (CR). Naturally-aspirated and turbocharged versions are also available. Kubota 03 Series and 03-M Series are manufactured in inline 3-, 4-, and 5-cylinder configurations. All Kubota 03 Series and 03-M Series engines have a  stroke, except the D1803 and V2403, which have a  stroke (which is basically a stroked-up design of the original 03 and 03-M Series).

The Kubota 03 Series and 03-M Series engines also offer side power take-off (PTO), in response to the trend of increasing hydraulic control devices in industrial machines. It is possible to install a hydraulic pump at two side PTO locations.

07 Series

The Kubota 07 Series is a totally new concept in engine design developed with various requirements necessary for a wide range of industrial applications. The engine package is smaller than that of the current  engine but yet the displacement is larger. The improved cooling system with a main water gallery and water passages between cylinder bores as a countermeasure against heat load provides high power density, superior endurance and a reliable Kubota 07 Series.

The New Kubota 07 Series engines have been designed to comply with EPA Interim Tier 4 (Option1) emissions regulations, which are the most stringent in this size range. Meeting emission regulations with minimal additional required devices: NOx is reduced only by mechanical means such as a compactly designed cooled exhaust gas recirculation (EGR) system.

Kubota's original E-CDIS (Center Direct Injection System) combustion system, renowned for clean combustion in the Kubota V3 (DI) Series, has been renovated. The fuel injection pressure was increased and the combustion chamber was redesigned to achieve a 25% lower particulate matter (PM) level, resulting in a better condition when compared to engines that only meet EPA Tier 3 regulations in this class.

These new engines have been designed to reduce transmitted vibrations and radiated sound, resulting in lower noise levels.

A Side PTO option is available. This engine offers power take-off (PTO) from a gear train located on the flywheel side designed for compact positioning of PTO hydraulic devices. Fan positions are available in two heights to adapt to various equipment configurations.

V3 Series

The Kubota V3 Series engines are available in both naturally aspirated and turbocharged induction systems. The V3 Series also available in indirect injection, direct injection, and common-rail direct injection. For the indirect injection system, Kubota uses E-TVCS (Three Vortex Combustion System) that has been improved. The airflow, combustion chamber and piston recess were optimized to provide a 25% lower particulate matter (PM) level. For the direct injection system, Kubota uses E-CDIS (Center Direct Injection System) with the injector at the center of the cylinder head. The latest V3 Series generation uses Common-Rail Direct Injection to meet the latest emission regulations.

Available only in 4-cylinder inline configuration, Kubota V3 Series engines are mainly used for gensets, medium-large tractors, medium-large construction equipment, forklifts, and special vehicles. Fan positions are available in two heights to adapt to various equipment configurations.

08 Series

Kubota 08 Series engine is the second largest diesel engine manufactured by Kubota. This engine uses Common-Rail Direct Injection System and 4-valve per cylinder. Turbo and intercooler are standard features. Kubota 08 Series is available only in 4-cylinder inline configuration. Kubota 08 Series engines are used for the large tractors lineup.

09 Series

Kubota 09 Series engine is the latest generation diesel engine manufactured by Kubota by 2017. This engine uses Common-Rail Direct Injection System and 4-valve per cylinder. Turbo and intercooler are standard features. Kubota 09 Series is available in 4-cylinder and 6-cylinder inline configuration. Kubota 09 Series engines are used for the large tractors line. Up to now, S7509-CR-TI is expected to become the largest engine manufactured by Kubota.

References

External links
Official website
Singapore
Article on compact diesel engines.

Engines by maker
Diesel engine manufacturers